Flame of Recca is a 42-episode anime series produced by Studio Pierrot and directed by Noriyuki Abe. It is an adaptation of the manga series of the same name by Nobuyuki Anzai. The plot follows the protagonist Recca Hanabishi, a teenage ninja with the ability to manipulate fire and a descendant of the Hokage, a ninja clan wiped out centuries ago.

The series aired in Japan from July 19, 1997 to July 10, 1998 on Fuji Television. Flame of Recca has also aired on the satellite network Animax in Japan and Asia. Pony Canyon has released the entire series on DVD and laserdisc, while Geneon released it in two DVD boxsets on April 22 and June 24, 2004 in Japan. In North America, Viz Media released the series in ten separate DVD volumes between October 26, 2004 and January 9, 2007.

The Flame of Recca anime series featured background music composed by Yusuke Honma.

Episode list

References

External links
Flame of Recca at Viz Media
Flame of Recca at Studio Pierrot 

Flame of Recca